The Guilarte Cabinet constituted the 15th cabinet of the Bolivian Republic. It was formed on 23 December 1847 after Eusebio Guilarte was installed as the 10th president of Bolivia following the resignation of José Ballivián, succeeding the Ballivián Cabinet. It was dissolved on 2 January 1848 upon Guilarte's overthrow in a coup d'état and was succeeded by the Fourth Cabinet of José Miguel de Velasco.

Composition

History 
Upon his assumption to office in his capacity as president of the Council of State, Guilarte established his ministerial cabinet, the only one of his short, ten day, mandate. It consisted of four ministers including himself as he remained in the post of minister of war, a position he had been holding in the cabinet of José Ballivián.

One future president and one current president, Eusebio Guilarte (1847–1848; in office), and Tomás Frías (1872–1873; 1874–1876) were members of this cabinet.

Cabinets

References

Notes

Footnotes

Bibliography 

 

1847 establishments in Bolivia
1848 disestablishments in Bolivia
Cabinets of Bolivia
Cabinets established in 1847
Cabinets disestablished in 1848